Raisa or Raissa is a female personal name. It is popular in Russia and South Asia (as a feminine form of Rais). It was also a historically typical female name amongst Jews of the Russian Empire, as a Hebrew and Yiddish origin variant.

Notable people named Raisa include:
 Raisa Akhmatova, internationally recognized Chechen poet
 Raisa Andriana, Indonesian singer
 Raisa Blokh, Russian poet
 Raisa Bogatyrova, Ukrainian politician
 Raisa Gorbacheva, wife of former Soviet leader Mikhail Gorbachev and a fundraiser for preservation of Russian heritage
 Raissa Khan-Panni, English singer
 Raissa Maritain, Russian-French philosopher and poet
 Rayisa Nedashkivska, Ukrainian and Soviet-era theater and cimema actress
 Raisa Orlova, Soviet/Russian writer and Americanist
 Raisa Smekhnova, former Soviet/Belarusian long-distance runner 
 Raisa Smetanina, former Soviet/Russian Nordic skiing champion
 Raisa Surnachevskaya, Soviet World War II fighter pilot

Fictional
 Raisa Pöttgen, a character from the second season of the anime Strike Witches

See also 
 Francia Raisa, American actress
 Miss Raisa, rapper
 Rosa Raisa, soprano

References

Russian feminine given names
Slavic feminine given names